Tre Små Kinesere are a pop group based in Trondheim, Norway which, since their beginning in the 1990s, have defined their own acoustic style.  They recorded nine albums between then and 2004 to come back in 2010.  The band was composed of Ulf Risnes (vocals and guitar), Øystein Hegge (vocals and keyboard), and Baard Slagsvold (vocals and bass).

History
Tre Små Kinesere was established in 1988, when the band recorded a track for the compilation album Den akustiske gitarliga.  After a number of concerts and favorable audience reaction in 1988 and 1989, the band was signed to the CBS/Sony label in June 1989. Their debut album, 365 Fri, was released on January 17, 1990.  This album was nominated for the Spellemannprisen in 1991, but did not receive it. In 1991, they released their second album, Luftpalass, which earned them the Spellemannprisen in 1992.

In spring 1995 the band received its second Spellemann Award. They won the prize in the band category for their fourth album, Hjertemedisin, which had been released the previous year.

In April 2004 it was announced that bassist Baard Slagsvold would be leaving the band. Risnes and Hegge completed some tour dates during the following summer with Truls Waagø as a stand-in, but the band officially broke up in February 2005. Risnes and Hegge stated at the time that it "would not feel right to continue without Baard."

Members

Present members
Ulf Risnes – lead vocals, guitar (1988 - 2005, 2010 -)
Lars Lien – piano, accordion, backing vocals (2013 -)
Eirik Øien – bass, backing vocals (2013 -)
Dag Erik Oksvold - drums, backing vocals (2013 -)
Freddy Bolsø – drums, backing vocals (2013 -)
Daniel Børmark – bass, backing vocals (2014 -)

Previous members
Knut Juel – drums (1988)
Baard Slagsvold – bass, vocals (1988 - 2004)
Øystein Hegge – piano, accordion, backing vocals (1988 - 2005, 2010 - 2012)
Truls Waagø – bass, vocals (2010 - 2013)

Selected discography

Studio albums

Compilation albums

Motorpsycho & Tre Små Kinesere
1997: Mot Riving (Harmonien Records)

References

External links 

Tre Små Kinesere, bio at Norsk Rikskringkasting (Norwegian)
Tre Små Kinesere, bio at soleplassland.net (Norwegian)

Norwegian pop music groups
Spellemannprisen winners
Musical groups established in 1988
1988 establishments in Norway
Musical groups disestablished in 2005
2005 disestablishments in Norway
Musical groups reestablished in 2010
Musical groups from Trondheim